Bezirk Linz-Land is a district of Upper Austria in Austria.

Municipalities 
Towns (Städte) are indicated in boldface; market towns (Marktgemeinden) in italics; suburbs, hamlets and other subdivisions of a municipality are indicated in small characters.

 Allhaming
 Ansfelden
 Asten
 Eggendorf im Traunkreis
 Enns
 Hargelsberg
 Hofkirchen im Traunkreis
 Hörsching
 Kematen an der Krems
 Kirchberg-Thening
 Kronstorf
 Leonding
 Neuhofen an der Krems
 Niederneukirchen
 Oftering
 Pasching
 Piberbach
 Pucking
 Sankt Florian
 Sankt Marien
 Traun
 Wilhering

External links 
  

 
Districts of Upper Austria